Gigi Fernández and Natasha Zvereva were the defending champions but only Zvereva competed that year with Lisa Raymond.

Raymond and Zvereva lost in the semifinals to Nicole Arendt and Jana Novotná.

Arendt and Novotná won in the final 6–2, 6–3 against Martina Hingis and Helena Suková.

Seeds
Champion seeds are indicated in bold text while text in italics indicates the round in which those seeds were eliminated.

 Lindsay Davenport /  Mary Joe Fernández (first round)
 Nicole Arendt /  Jana Novotná (champions)
 Lisa Raymond /  Natasha Zvereva (semifinals)
 Martina Hingis /  Helena Suková (semifinals)

Draw

External links
 1996 Porsche Tennis Grand Prix Doubles Draw

Porsche Tennis Grand Prix
1996 WTA Tour